The Government of Free Vietnam (GFCL) was an anti-communist political organization that was established 30 April 1995 by Nguyen Hoang Dan. It was dissolved in 2013. It claimed an unrecognized government in exile of the Republic of Vietnam headquartered in the U.S. cities of Garden Grove, California and Missouri City, Texas.

Organization

Political goals
The Government of Free Vietnam had stated a list of the political goals of its organization:
 The stated goal of the Provisional National Government of Vietnam is to achieve free and democratic elections in Vietnam. The government seeks to create an atmosphere of non-violent pressure on the Communist's regime to allow for an election process whereby the people can choose whether or not to retain communism as the preferred system of governance
 Provisional National Government of Vietnam has extolled before that achieving a fair and evenhanded oil policy for the benefit of the citizens of Vietnam and other businesses of the world can be achieved without violence and undeterred by the corrupt communist government practices.
 Free market ideas we wish to incorporate into the culture of Vietnam that helps all processes.  
 A fair opportunity to use Vietnam's national maritime oil resource and free waterways.
 A prevention of possible clashes of Vietnam's neighboring countries due to illegal controls and restrictions. 
 The aggravated communist criminals must be brought to justice and that they must be ordered to pay for the consequences of their crimes, for the world to know and set examples for those tyrannical regimes against humanities.
 Prohibit all forms of provocation, and Re-stablish South Vietnam countrywide.

Economy 
The GFVN had an approximate budget of US$1 million a year, donated by Vietnamese Anti-communist overseas around the world.

Base in Cambodia
KC-702 was a military base that was operated by the Provisional Government of Free Vietnam, probably located in Cambodia, near the Vietnamese border. It is believed that this was once used to help plan the failed Vietnamese Embassy bombing in Laos. The current status of the camp is not known. However, in 1999 several members of the group were captured in Cambodia with weapons, deported to Vietnam and charged.

See also
 Third Republic of Vietnam (Provisional National Government of Vietnam)
 Chhun Yasith, leader of the Cambodian Freedom Fighters
 Le Chi Thuc, a spokesperson for the Government of Free Vietnam
 Vang Pao, a Major General in the Royal Lao Army, a leader in the Hmong American community in the United States
 Khmers Kampuchea-Krom Federation
 Montagnard Foundation, Inc.
 Nationalist Party of Greater Vietnam
 People's Action Party of Vietnam
 Vietnamese Constitutional Monarchist League
 List of governments in exile

References

Further reading

External links

Archival collections
Guide to the Government of Free Vietnam Publicity and Organizational Materials. Special Collections and Archives, The UC Irvine Libraries, Irvine, California.

Other
Vietnam: 37 jailed on terrorism charges BBC NEWS
Vietnam Calls O.C. Group Terrorists by Los Angeles Times
Vietnam tries opposition group BBC NEWS
Vietnam court jails US citizens "BBC NEWS"

Vietnamese democracy movements
1995 establishments in the United States
2013 disestablishments in the United States
Anti-communism in Vietnam
Anti-communist organizations in the United States
Former governments in exile
National liberation movements
Organizations based in Garden Grove, California
Organizations established in 1995
Organizations disestablished in 2013
Overseas Vietnamese organizations in the United States
Politics of Vietnam
Vietnamese anti-communists
South Vietnam